Dinoxanthin is a type of xanthophyll found in dinoflagellates. This compound is a potential antioxidant and may help to protect dinoflagellates against reactive oxygen species.

References

Carotenoids